Scotura quadripuncta is a moth of the family Notodontidae. It is found in Amazonian Brazil and southern Venezuela.

The length of the forewings is 12 mm for males and 13.5–14 mm for females. The ground color of the forewings is light steely gray-brown. The ground color of the hindwings is light steely gray-brown with a white central area, forming a large elongate oval.

Etymology
The name refers to the four white forewing spots, contrasting it with Scotura fulviceps, which bears only three.

References

Moths described in 2008
Notodontidae of South America